Strung Out is a band.

Strung Out may also refer to:

"Strung Out", a song by Betty Blowtorch from Are You Man Enough?
"Strung Out", a song by Mutya Buena from Real Girl
"Strung Out", a song by Steve Perry, from Street Talk
"Strung Out", a song by Van Halen, from Balance
"Strung Out", a song by Andy McCoy

See also